Strait Metropolitan Post (海峡都市报; 海峽都市報), or Strait Metropolis Daily, officially transliterated as Strait News, is a Fujian-based comprehensive urban life newspaper, officially launched on October 1, 1997. It is published by the Fujian Daily Office (福建日报社), and owned by Fujian Daily Press Group.

In 1998, Strait Metropolitan Post - Southern Fujian Version was launched.

References

Newspapers established in 1997
Daily newspapers published in China
1997 establishments in China